Charles Fortin (Paris in 1815 – Paris in 1865) was a French genre and landscape painter.

Biography
Fortin, born in Paris in 1815, was the son of Augustin Félix Fortin.  He studied under Beaume and Roqueplan, and first exhibited in 1835. He died in Paris in 1865.

Works
Amongst his works are: 
The Rag-seller. 
The Return to the Cottage. 
The Chimney Corner. 
The Butcher's Shop. 
The Village Barber. 
Chouans. 1853. (Lille Museum.) 
The Blessing. (Luxembourg Gallery.) 
The Music Lesson. 
The Smoker. 1855. 
During Vespers, Morbihan. (Paris Exhibition, 1855.) 
Rustic Interior. 1859. 
The Country Tailor. 1861. 
Between two Halts. 1864.

References

1815 births
1865 deaths
19th-century French painters
French male painters
Painters from Paris
Burials at Père Lachaise Cemetery
19th-century French male artists